Giovanni Battista Galestruzzi (1618–1677) was an Italian painter and etcher of the Baroque period. Born in Florence, he was a pupil of the painter Francesco Furini, then moved to Rome, where he joined the Accademia di San Luca in 1652. He was an accomplished etcher and produced works for Leonardo Agostini’s book 'Le gemme antiche figurate' (1657–9). The Roman baroque painter and engraver Giovanni Francesco Venturini was probably his pupil.

References

Further reading 
 Galestruzzi, Giovanni Battista in "Dizionario Biografico"

External links 

 Giovanni Battista Galestruzzi - Google Arts & Culture

1618 births
1677 deaths
17th-century Italian painters
Italian male painters
Painters from Florence
Italian etchers
Italian Baroque painters
Painters from Rome